Antônio Gilberto Maniaes (7 March 1962 – 24 June 2014), commonly known as Giba, was a Brazilian retired footballer who played as a right back, and a former manager.

Giba notably represented Guarani and Corinthians as a player, while being in charge of more than 20 clubs as a manager.

Honours

Manager
CSA
Campeonato Alagoano: 1998

Etti Jundiaí
Campeonato Brasileiro Série C: 2001
Campeonato Paulista Série A2: 2001

References

External links

1962 births
2014 deaths
Footballers from São Paulo (state)
Brazilian footballers
Association football defenders
Campeonato Brasileiro Série A players
Associação Atlética Internacional (Limeira) players
União São João Esporte Clube players
Guarani FC players
Sport Club Corinthians Paulista players
Brazilian football managers
Campeonato Brasileiro Série A managers
Campeonato Brasileiro Série B managers
Paulista Futebol Clube managers
Centro Sportivo Alagoano managers
Santos FC managers
Sociedade Esportiva do Gama managers
Guarani FC managers
Clube Atlético Sorocaba managers
Associação Portuguesa de Desportos managers
Santa Cruz Futebol Clube managers
Clube do Remo managers
Sport Club do Recife managers
Associação Desportiva São Caetano managers
Ipatinga Futebol Clube managers
Fortaleza Esporte Clube managers
Rio Branco Esporte Clube managers
Joinville Esporte Clube managers
Grêmio Barueri Futebol managers
Kuwait SC managers